WDSM (710 kHz) is a commercial AM radio station licensed to Superior, Wisconsin, serving the Duluth-Superior area of Northeastern Minnesota and Northwestern Wisconsin.  WDSM is owned and operated by Midwest Communications and broadcasts a sports radio format.  The radio studios and offices for WDSM, KDAL, KDAL-FM, KDKE, WDUL and KTCO are at 11 East Superior Street, Suite 380, in downtown Duluth.

By day, WDSM is powered at 10,000 watts non-directional.  Because 710 AM is a clear channel frequency reserved for WOR New York City and KIRO Seattle, WDSM reduces power to 5,000 watts and uses a directional antenna with a four-tower array at night to avoid interference.

Previous Talk Programming
Weekdays on WDSM began with two local shows, "Wake Up Call with Neill Atkins" and "Sound Off with Brad Bennett."  The rest of the weekday schedule was largely made up of nationally syndicated shows:  Sean Hannity, Mark Levin, Dennis Prager, Hugh Hewitt, Sebastian Gorka and Mike Gallagher.

Weekends featured shows on money, health, religion, technology and the military.  Weekend hosts included Kim Komando and Eric Metaxas.  Most hours begin with world and national news from Fox News Radio.

History
The requested call sign was W Duluth Superior Mutual, referring to the station's network affiliation with the Mutual Broadcasting System (MBS). WDSM provided Mutual programming throughout the Iron Range of Northern Minnesota as well as the Duluth-Superior market. It carried Mutual's dramas, comedies, news and sports during the "Golden Age of Television."

In the early 1940s, WDSM was powered at only 100 watts and broadcast on 1200 kilocycles.  The studios were in the Board of Trade Building in Superior.  Robert Ridder purchased WDSM in 1948, and became its president.

WDSM switched network affiliations with WEBC (560 AM) in 1955.  WEBC became the Mutual affiliate and WDSM began carrying NBC Radio programming and news. This was a direct result of WDSM's commitment to television and its founding of WDSM-TV on March 1, 1954, as an NBC affiliate (now KDLH-TV). 
WDSM stayed with NBC Radio until the early 1990s. The station aired a country format during the 1980s, and then sports radio during the 1990s. Around 2000, WDSM switched to a talk radio format.  It carried The Rush Limbaugh Show in middays as the cornerstone of its talk programming.

On February 7, 2022, WDSM changed their format from talk to sports, branded as "710 The Game".

Previous logo

References

External links
WDSM official website

Sports radio stations in the United States
Radio stations in Superior, Wisconsin
Radio stations established in 1955
1955 establishments in Minnesota
Midwest Communications radio stations